Kazakhstan competed at the 2016 Summer Olympics in Rio de Janeiro, Brazil, from 5 to 21 August 2016. It was the nation's sixth consecutive appearance at the Summer Olympics in the post-Soviet era. The National Olympic Committee of the Republic of Kazakhstan fielded a roster of 104 athletes, 55 men and 49 women, to compete across seventeen different sports at these Games, the smallest Summer Olympic team since the nation's debut in Atlanta 1996. Moreover, Kazakhstan did not send teams in any of the team sports for the first time in twenty years. Track and field accounted for the largest number of athletes on the Kazakh squad, with 25 entries. There was a single competitor each in slalom canoeing, track cycling, fencing, and table tennis (for the first time after an eight-year absence).

Four of the nation's Olympic medalists from London 2012 returned, defending triple jump champion Olga Rypakova, Russian-born wrestling veteran Guzel Manyurova, and boxers Adilbek Niyazymbetov (light heavyweight) and Ivan Dychko (super heavyweight). Triple jumper and 2006 Asian Games runner-up Roman Valiyev was the most experience Kazakh athlete, participating in his fourth Games. Along with Rypakova and Manyurova, six more athletes also made their third Olympic appearance, including boxing quarterfinalist Birzhan Zhakypov in the men's light flyweight division, and sprint kayaker Natalya Sergeyeva (aged 40), the oldest athlete of the roster. Heavyweight taekwondo fighter Ruslan Zhaparov was nominated by the committee to carry the Kazakh flag at the opening ceremony.

Kazakhstan returned home from Rio de Janeiro with 18 medals (three golds, five silver, and ten bronze), marking its most successful outcome in Summer Olympic history. As expected, most of the medals were distributed to the Kazakh athletes in both boxing and weightlifting, including a gold each from Youth Olympian Nijat Rahimov (men's 77 kg) and welterweight boxer Daniyar Yeleussinov. The remaining gold medal, however, went to swimmer Dmitriy Balandin, who surprisingly outlasted the favorites from the outside in the men's 200 m breaststroke to hand the Kazakhs their historic first Olympic swimming title.

Apart from the winners, other medalists also included fellow boxers Niyazymbetov and Dychko, who managed to repeat their London 2012 feats in their respective weight divisions; Rypakova, who scored another medal with a bronze in the women's triple jump, bowing out of her title defense to Colombia's Caterine Ibargüen; Manyurova, who wrestled her way towards a runner-up finish in the women's 75 kg, adding a silver to her career hardware of three medals; and weightlifter Denis Ulanov, who received the bronze in the men's 85 kg, following the disqualification of Romania's Gabriel Sîncrăian over a doping offense.

Medalists

| width=78% align=left valign=top |

| width="22%" align="left" valign="top" |

Competitors
The following is the list of number of competitors participating in the Games:

Archery
 
Two Kazakh archers qualified each for both the men's and women's individual recurve by obtaining one of the three Olympic places available from the 2015 Asian Archery Championships in Bangkok, Thailand.

Athletics
 
Kazakh athletes have so far achieved qualifying standards in the following athletics events (up to a maximum of 3 athletes in each event):

Track & road events
Men

Women

Field events
Men

Women

Boxing

Kazakhstan has entered twelve boxers (10 men and 2 women) to compete in each of the following weight classes into the Olympic boxing tournament. Berik Abdrakhmanov and two-time Olympian Birzhan Zhakypov were the first Kazakhs to be selected to the Olympic team with a top two finish in the AIBA Pro Boxing series, while Vasiliy Levit did so in the World Series of Boxing.

2012 Olympian Daniyar Yeleussinov was the only Kazakh boxer qualifying through the 2015 World Championships. Meanwhile, seven further boxers (Yeraliyev, Sattibayev, Zhussupov, Alimkhanuly, Niyazymbetov, Dychko, and Shakimova) had claimed their Olympic spots at the 2016 Asia & Oceania Qualification Tournament in  Qian'an, China.

Zhaina Shekerbekova rounded out the Kazakh boxing roster with a quarterfinal victory in women's flyweight division at the World Championships in Astana.

Men

Women

Canoeing

Slalom
Kazakh canoeists have qualified a maximum of one boat in each of the following classes through the 2015 ICF Canoe Slalom World Championships and the 2016 Asian Championships.

Sprint
Kazakh canoeists have qualified one boat in each of the following events through the 2015 ICF Canoe Sprint World Championships. The sprint canoeing squad, highlighted by London 2012 Olympians Natalya Sergeyeva and kayak duo of Yevgeniy Alexeyev and Alexey Dergunov, were officially named to the Kazakhstan roster on July 24, 2016.

Men

Women

Qualification Legend: FA = Qualify to final (medal); FB = Qualify to final B (non-medal)

Cycling

Road
Kazakh riders qualified for a maximum of two quota places in the men's Olympic road race by virtue of their top 4 national ranking in the 2015 UCI Asia Tour. NOC Kazakhstan had named rookies Bakhtiyar Kozhatayev and Alexey Lutsenko to the Olympic team on June 29, 2016.

On July 30, 2016, Lutsenko withdrew from the Games due to a foot injury sustained from a car accident during his training in France, so his spot was awarded to a fellow cyclist Andrey Zeits.

Track
Following the completion of the 2016 UCI Track Cycling World Championships, Kazakhstan has entered one rider to compete in the men's omnium at the Olympics, by virtue of his final individual UCI Olympic ranking in that event.

Omnium

Fencing

Kazakhstan has entered one fencer into the Olympic competition. Ilya Mokretsov claimed his Olympic spot in the men's sabre with a top-three finish at the Asian Zonal Qualifier in Wuxi, China.

Gymnastics

Rhythmic 
Kazakhstan has qualified one rhythmic gymnast in the individual all-around for the Games by claiming one of eight available Olympic spots at the Olympic Test Event in Rio de Janeiro.

Trampoline
Kazakhstan has qualified one gymnast in the men's trampoline by picking up a spare berth freed by the Tripartite Commission, as the next highest from the eligible NOC on the individual ranking list at the 2016 Olympic Test Event in Rio de Janeiro.

Judo

Kazakhstan has qualified a total of six judokas for each of the following weight classes at the Games. Four of them (three men and one woman) were ranked among the top 22 eligible judokas for men and top 14 for women in the IJF World Ranking List of May 30, 2016, while Marian Urdabayeva at women's lightweight (57 kg) earned a continental quota spot from the Asian region, as Kazakhstan's top-ranked judoka outside of direct qualifying position.

Being the highest-ranked judoka outside the world's top 22, Didar Khamza took over the vacant spot for Kazakhstan in the men's 73 kg, as Canada's Arthur Margelidon had been pulled out from the Games with a fractured forearm.

Modern pentathlon

Kazakhstan has qualified two modern pentathletes for the following events at the Games. Yelena Potapenko had claimed an Olympic spot as the highest-ranked eligible modern pentathlete outside the top five at the 2015 Asia & Oceania Championships. Meanwhile, London 2012 Olympian Pavel Ilyashenko received a spare Olympic berth freed by one of the South Koreans, as the highest-ranked eligible modern pentathlete, not yet qualified, in the men's event at the same meet.

Rowing

Kazakhstan has qualified one boat each in the men's and women's single sculls for the Olympics at the 2016 Asia & Oceania Continental Qualification Regatta in Chungju, South Korea.

Qualification Legend: FA=Final A (medal); FB=Final B (non-medal); FC=Final C (non-medal); FD=Final D (non-medal); FE=Final E (non-medal); FF=Final F (non-medal); SA/B=Semifinals A/B; SC/D=Semifinals C/D; SE/F=Semifinals E/F; QF=Quarterfinals; R=Repechage

Shooting

Kazakh shooters have achieved quota places for the following events by virtue of their best finishes at the 2015 ISSF World Cup series, and Asian Championships, as long as they obtained a minimum qualifying score (MQS) by March 31, 2016.

Qualification Legend: Q = Qualify for the next round; q = Qualify for the bronze medal (shotgun)

Swimming

Kazakh swimmers have so far achieved qualifying standards in the following events (up to a maximum of 2 swimmers in each event at the Olympic Qualifying Time (OQT), and potentially 1 at the Olympic Selection Time (OST)):

Synchronized swimming

Kazakhstan has fielded a squad of two synchronized swimmers to compete only in the women's duet by virtue of their tenth-place finish at the FINA Olympic test event in Rio de Janeiro.

Table tennis

Kazakhstan has entered one athlete into the table tennis competition at the Games for the first time since 2008. Kirill Gerassimenko scored a second-stage draw victory to book one of six remaining Olympic spots in the men's singles at the Asian Qualification Tournament in Hong Kong.

Taekwondo
 
Kazakhstan entered three athletes into the taekwondo competition at the Olympics. Ruslan Zhaparov, Ainur Yesbergenova, and Cansel Deniz secured Olympic spots in the men's heavyweight (+80 kg), women's flyweight (49 kg), and women's welterweight category (67 kg) by virtue of their top two finish at the 2016 Asian Qualification Tournament in Manila, Philippines.

Tennis

Kazakhstan has entered four tennis players into the Olympic tournament. London 2012 Olympians Mikhail Kukushkin (world no. 61) and Galina Voskoboeva (world no. 451), along with rookie Yulia Putintseva (world no. 35), qualified directly among the top 56 eligible players for their respective singles events based on the ATP and WTA World Rankings as of June 6, 2016. Voskoboeva also opted to play with her London 2012 partner Yaroslava Shvedova in the women's doubles.

On July 20, 2016, Kukushkin announced his withdrawal from the Games due to an injury sustained in the Wimbledon match, with Putintseva joining him nine days later because of the shoulder injury.

Weightlifting

Kazakh weightlifters have qualified a maximum of six men's and four women's quota places for the Rio Olympics based on their combined team standing by points at the 2014 and 2015 IWF World Championships. The team must allocate these places to individual athletes by June 20, 2016.

On June 22, 2016, the International Weightlifting Federation had decided to strip one Olympic men's and one women's entry place each from Kazakhstan because of "multiple positive cases" of doping throughout the qualifying period.

The full weightlifting squad, led by London 2012 Olympian Alexandr Zaichikov, was named to the Olympic roster on July 12, 2016.

Men

1 Rahimov originally won the gold medal, but was disqualified in March 2022 after a doping violation.

Women

Wrestling

Kazakhstan has qualified a total of twelve wrestlers for each of the following weight classes into the Olympic competition. Three of them had booked Olympic spots as one of the top six finalists each in the men's freestyle 57 kg, and the men's Greco-Roman 59 & 75 kg at the 2015 World Championships, while the majority of Olympic berths were awarded to Kazakh wrestlers, who progressed to the top two finals at the 2016 Asian Qualification Tournament.

The wrestling squad was named to the Olympic roster on June 13, 2016, with two-time medalist Guzel Manyurova aiming for another medal in the women's heavyweight at her third Games.

Men's freestyle

Men's Greco-Roman

Women's freestyle

See also
Kazakhstan at the 2016 Summer Paralympics

References

External links 

 

Olympics
2016
Nations at the 2016 Summer Olympics